Harold Everett Sawyer (December 15, 1890 – January 18, 1969) was an American prelate who served as Bishop of Erie, Pennsylvania from 1946 to 1951.

Early life and education 
Sawyer was born on December 15, 1890 in Clinton, Connecticut, the son of Enoch Augustus Sawyer and Matella Julia Waterhouse. He graduated from Trinity College with a Bachelor of Arts in 1913, and from General Theological Seminary in 1916. He also graduated with a Master of Arts from Columbia University in 1919. On May 28, 1947, the General Theological Seminary, conferred a Doctor of Sacred Theology upon Sawyer.

Ordained Ministry
Sawyer was ordained deacon in June 1916. He was ordained priest by the Bishop of Connecticut Chauncey B. Brewster on May 15, 1917 in Christ Church, New Haven. He served his diaconate between 1916 and 1917 as curate of the Church of the Redeemer in Morristown, New Jersey. On October 1, 1917, he became rector of St Agnes' Chapel, part of Trinity Parish in New York City. Between 1924 and 1946 he served as rector of Grace Church in Utica, New York.

Bishop
Sawyer was elected Bishop of Erie on September 4, 1946 on the fifth ballot, during a special diocesan convention. He was consecrated on November 6, 1946 in Grace Church, by the Presiding Bishop Henry St. George Tucker. He retired in November 1951 and died on January 18, 1969.

References 

1890 births
1969 deaths
20th-century American Episcopalians
Episcopal bishops of Northwestern Pennsylvania
20th-century American clergy